Minoa murinata, the drab looper, is a moth of the family Geometridae. The species was first described by Giovanni Antonio Scopoli in his 1763 Entomologia Carniolica. It can be found in southern and central Europe, Great Britain, Anatolia, the Caucasus and the mountains of central Asia and Mongolia.

The wingspan is 14–18 mm. The length of the forewings is 9–11 mm. The moths fly from June to August depending on the location.

The larvae feed on cypress spurge and wood spurge.

Subspecies
Minoa murinata murinata (Europe, Russia, Asia Minor, Central Asia)
Minoa murinata amylaria Prout, 1914 (Alps, Italy)
Minoa murinata limburgia Lempke, 1969 (Netherlands)
Minoa murinata lutea Schwingenschuss, 1954 (Russia)

References

External links

Drab looper on UKMoths
Fauna Europaea
Lepiforum e.V.
De Vlinderstichting 

Asthenini
Moths described in 1763
Moths of Europe
Moths of Asia
Taxa named by Giovanni Antonio Scopoli